The following is a family tree of the Princes of Monaco.

Monaco, Princes of
 Family tree